is a district, and is within the Minami-ku, Hiroshima ward, Ward (electoral subdivision), one of the 
eight wards that comprise the Hiroshima Prefecture, in Japan. 
'Minami', is Japanese for 'South'. 'Ku', is loosely suggestive of a division, such as 'compartment', 'boundary', etc..

It is the location of Mazda's automobile factory which has been on the site since the early 1930s.

As of 1798 population data but counting decreases due to the March 20, 2005 merger, the district has an estimated population of 116,573 and a density of 1588 persons per km2. The total area is 73.41 km2.

Towns and villages 
Fuchū
Kaita
Kumano
Saka

Mergers

On April 1, 2003 the town of Shimokamigari was merged into the city of Kure.
On November 1, 2004 the town of Etajima absorbed the towns of Nōmi, Ōgaki and Okimi, from Saeki District, to become the new city of Etajima.
On March 20, 2005 the towns of Ondo, Kurahashi and Kamagari were merged into Kure.

Districts in Hiroshima Prefecture